Aizome may refer to:

, the Japanese word for indigo dye
A single by savage Genius, a Japanese band